Serifopoula is a Greek island in the Cyclades. It is a part of the municipality of Serifos. Serifopoula was uninhabited at the 2001 Greek census. The island is largely barren of vegetation, and consists of a large main island  in size, and a small rock, separated by a small  strait to the island's east,  in size.

References

Islands of Greece
Cyclades
Landforms of Milos (regional unit)
Islands of the South Aegean